The Thin Blue Lie is a 2000 television film directed by Roger Young and starring Rob Morrow, Randy Quaid, and Paul Sorvino. It was released on August 13, 2000. The title is a reference to the phrase "thin blue line" used to describe the hypothetical role of law enforcement as the line between order and chaos.

Plot
The premise of the film concerns Philadelphia Inquirer reporter Jonathan Neumann (Rob Morrow), who, along with his partner Phil Chadway (Randy Quaid), won the Pulitzer Prize in 1978 for a series of articles exposing Philadelphia mayor Frank Rizzo (Paul Sorvino) and the Philadelphia Police Department for corruption.  According to the articles, suspects were beaten and tortured in interrogation rooms in an effort to meet the high quota of criminal cases solved by Philadelphia detectives.  Neumann and Chadway met extreme opposition from the police department, working amidst phone tappings, apartment ransackings, and threats of death and bodily harm.

Cast

Rob Morrow as Jonathan Neumann
Randy Quaid as Phil Chadway
Paul Sorvino as Frank Rizzo
Cynthia Preston as Kate Johnson
G.W. Bailey as K.C.
Al Waxman as Art Zugler
Beau Starr as Detective Marshall
Barry Wiggins as Detective King
Chuck Shamata as Vinnie
Louis Di Bianco as Deep Nightstick
Melissa DiMarco as Sandra Durano
Bruce McFee as Detective Harris
Joe Pingue as Detective Regossi
Philip Granger as John Reilly
Hayley Tyson as Sharon Chadway
Patrick Patterson as Chief Inspector Golden
Christian Potenza as Danny O'Brien
Richard Clarkin as Scala
Ryan Rajendra Black as Alberto
Joanne Boland
Michael Copeman as Jack Reynolds
Jason Jones as Prosecutor
Kelsa Kinsly as Reporter
Chantal Lonergan as Chelsea
Mayumi Rinas Mrs. Gonzalez
Juan Carlos Velis as Miguel Gonzalez
Scott Walker as Fire Chief

Issues pertaining to journalism ethics
Throughout the movie, Neumann faced a number of ethical dilemmas. First, most of his colleagues disagreed that he should pursue claims of torture from "suspects," citing that the city's crime level was at an all-time low, and to question Rizzo's police policies would put the city's safety in jeopardy.  Second, when interviewing victims of police brutality, Neumann had to assure the frightened victims that they would not be harmed by talking to him, when in fact, they had been threatened by police and warned against talking to and/or cooperating with reporters. Third, Neumann had to find one detective willing to essentially betray his fellow officers in order to substantiate his claims.

See also
Rizzo v. Goode
Use of torture by police in the United States

External links
 
 

2000 films
2000 crime drama films
Films directed by Roger Young
American crime drama films
Fictional portrayals of the Philadelphia Police Department
Films set in Philadelphia
Films shot in Toronto
Films shot in Philadelphia
Showtime (TV network) films
Police brutality in the United States
African-American history in Philadelphia
Philadelphia Police Department
Torture in the United States
2000s English-language films
2000s American films